Chirish is an abandoned village in the Kajaran Municipality of Syunik Province of Armenia.

See also 
Syunik Province

References 

Ghost towns in Europe